This article is a list of Brazilian flags.

National Flags

Government flags

Ministries

Imperial standards of Brazil

Diplomatic services flags

Military flags

Brazilian Army

Brazilian Navy

Police flags

First-level administrative divisions 

This list shows the flags of the 26 Brazilian States and the Federal District.

History

Municipalities

Political flags

Separatist movements flags

Ethnic groups flags

Historical flags

Proposed flags

House flags of Brazilian freight companies

Yacht clubs of Brazil

See also
Flag of Brazil
Hino Nacional Brasileiro

References

Flags of Brazil
Brazil
Flags